Acanthodica fassli is a moth of the family Noctuidae. It is found in Bolivia.

Catocalina
Moths of South America
Moths described in 1916